Silas Pereira (born 12 September 1934) is a Brazilian footballer. He played in two matches for the Brazil national football team in 1963. He was also part of Brazil's squad for the 1963 South American Championship.

References

External links
 

1934 births
Living people
Brazilian footballers
Brazil international footballers
Association football goalkeepers
People from Ponta Grossa
Sportspeople from Paraná (state)